Eprazinone (trade names Eftapan, Isilung, Mucitux) is a mucolytic and bronchospasm relieving drug. It has been marketed in many European countries, but not in the US or United Kingdom.

Indications
Indications include acute and chronic bronchitis, cough, rhinitis, and asthma.

Side effects
Adverse effects include headache, somnolence, vertigo, heartburn, and nausea.

References 

Piperazines
Aromatic ketones
Phenylethanolamine ethers